Sybrand Lourens Venter  (born 25 June 1976) is a South African former rugby union player.

Playing career
Venter matriculated at Kalahari High School in Kuruman and represented  at the 1994 Craven Week tournament.

Venter toured with the Springboks to Britain and Ireland in 1998 and played in four tour matches.

See also
List of South Africa national rugby union players – Springbok no. 672

References

1976 births
Living people
South African rugby union players
South Africa international rugby union players
Griquas (rugby union) players
Leopards (rugby union) players
Lions (United Rugby Championship) players
Rugby union players from the Northern Cape
Rugby union centres
Rugby union wings